The National Hydrogen Energy Road Map (NHERM) is a program in India initiated by the National Hydrogen Energy Board (NHEB) in 2003 and approved in 2006 for bridging the technological gaps in different areas of hydrogen energy, including its production, storage, transportation and delivery, applications, safety, codes and standards and capacity building for the period up to 2020. The program is under direction of the Ministry of New and Renewable Energy (MNRE).

The project aims to reduce India's dependence on import of petroleum products, promote the use of diverse, domestic, and sustainable new and renewable energy sources; to provide electricity to remote, far‐flung, rural and other electricity deficient areas and promote use of hydrogen as a fuel for transport and power generation; to reduce carbon emissions from energy production and consumption, to increase reliability and efficiency of electricity generation; to generate 1000 MW electricity using fuel cells by 2020 and 1 Million vehicles running on Hydrogen based IC Engines and fuel cells by 2020.

See also

Hydrogen economy
Electricity sector in India
Renewable energy in India

References

External links
Ministry of New and Renewable Energy homepage
International Partnership for the Hydrogen Economy

Hydrogen economy
Renewable energy in India
Ministry of New and Renewable Energy